James W. Carr is an American Educator. Dr. Carr was nominated by President George W. Bush to the National Security Education Board in 2005 and served in that capacity until 2011. In 2020 Dr. Carr was appointed by U.S House minority leader, Representative Kevin McCarthy, to the United States Commission on International Religious Freedom.   Before retirement in 2019 Dr. Carr had served as a Professor of Business, Senior Vice President and Executive Vice President of Harding University in Searcy, Arkansas. Carr was appointed to the Arkansas Forestry Commission in 2004 by Arkansas Governor Mike Huckabee and was reappointed to the Commission in 2012 by Arkansas Governor Mike Beebe, during which time he served as Vice Chairman of the Board. In 2015 Dr. Carr was appointed by Governor Asa Hutchinson to the Arkansas Higher Education Coordinating Board, where he  served as Chairman from 2018-2020. Dr. Carr has served on the board of directors of World Christian Broadcasting since 1993. From 1980 to 1984 Dr. Carr served on the board of directors of the Comsafe Company, a Jack Nicklaus-Golden Bear company headquartered in Tallahassee and West Palm Beach. He currently serves on the executive board of the Quapaw Council of the Boy Scouts of America, on the board of the Arkansas State Chamber of Commerce and on the Business Board of First Community Bank. He has been awarded twice with bronze medallions by The Arkansas Martin Luther King Commission for the promotion of racial harmony within the state.

Prior to joining the administration of Harding University, Carr served as a Regional Director at The American College Testing Program (ACT) and in various administrative positions at Florida State University. He received his Bachelor of Science from Harding University and later received his PhD from Florida State University. He has consulted with hundreds of colleges and universities in the area of institutional marketing. He is married to Susan Housley Carr and has 3 children, Chelsea Taylor, Lance Carr and Anna Carr

References

External links
 James W. Carr, Commissioner, USCIRF Biography
 ADHE

Florida State University alumni
Harding University people
Presidency of George W. Bush
Living people
1948 births
American members of the Churches of Christ